Sarab-e Garm or Sarab Garm or Sarabgarm may refer to:
 Sarab-e Garm Garab
 Sarab-e Garm-e Olya
 Sarab-e Garm-e Sofla